Callard is a surname. Notable people with the surname include:

Agnes Callard (born 1976), American philosopher
Andrea Callard (born 1950), media artist long connected with the artists group Colab in New York City
Beverley Callard (born 1957), English actress, known for her roles as June Dewhurst and Liz McDonald in ITV's Coronation Street
Charles G. Callard (1923–2004), known in the financial community for innovative application of mathematics and statistics to stock analysis
Jon Callard (born 1966), coach at the Rugby Football Union's National Academy
Kay Callard (1923–2008), Canadian film and television actress who spent most of her career in Britain
Rebecca Callard (born 1975), English actress from Leeds
Tanya Callard, character in the British TV series Emmerdale in 2009

See also
Callard & Bowser, New York subsidiary of Wm. Wrigley Jr. Company, responsible for Altoids mints and other products
Alard (disambiguation)
Allard
Calla